SP-215  is a state highway in the state of São Paulo in Brazil. Part of it consists of the Rodovia Luís Augusto de Oliveira, Rodovia Dr. Paulo Lauro and Rodovia Deputado Vicente Botta.

References

Highways in São Paulo (state)